Wild by Law: The Rise of Environmentalism and the Creation of the Wilderness Act is a 1991 documentary film produced by Lawrence Hott and Diane Garey. It also aired as an episode of PBS' American Experience. It was nominated for an Academy Award for Best Documentary Feature.

The film is about the work of Aldo Leopold, Bob Marshall, founder of The Wilderness Society and Howard Zahniser. The film gives the philosophical and political underpinnings of the Wilderness Act of 1964. It was narrated by Linda Hunt.

References

External links

Wild by Law: The Rise of Environmentalism and the Creation of the Wilderness Act at Direct Cinema

1991 films
1991 documentary films
American Experience
American documentary films
1990s English-language films
Documentary films about environmental issues
1990s American films